The Grevilleoideae are a subfamily of the plant family Proteaceae. Mainly restricted to the Southern Hemisphere, it contains around 46 genera and about 950 species. Genera include Banksia, Grevillea, and Macadamia.

Description
The Grevilleoideae grow as trees, shrubs, or subshrubs. They are highly variable, making a simple, diagnostic identification key for the subfamily essentially impossible to provide. One common and fairly diagnostic characteristic is the occurrence of flowers in pairs that share a common bract. However, a few Grevilleoideae taxa do not have this property, having solitary flowers or inflorescences of unpaired flowers. In most taxa, the flowers occur in densely packed heads or spikes, and the fruit is a follicle.

Distribution and habitat
Grevilleoideae are mainly a Southern Hemisphere family. The main centre of diversity is Australia, with around 700 of 950 species occurring there, and South America also contains taxa. However, the Grevilleoideae are barely present in Africa; almost all of the Proteaceae taxa there belong to the subfamily Proteoideae. The Brabejum tree of Cape Town is the exception, and the only grevilleoid in Africa.

Taxonomy

The framework for classification of the Proteaceae was laid by L.A.S. Johnson and Barbara Briggs in their 1975 monograph "On the Proteaceae: the evolution and classification of a southern family". Their classification has been refined somewhat over the ensuing three decades, most notably by Peter H. Weston and Nigel Barker in 2006. The Grevilleoideae are now considered one of five subfamilies of the Proteaceae. The placement and circumscription of the Grevilleoideae in four tribes, according to Weston and Barker can be summarised as:
 Tribe incertae sedis
Sphalmium — Carnarvonia

Roupaleae
Authority: Meisn.
incertae sedis
Megahertzia — Knightia — Eucarpha — Triunia
Subtribe Roupalinae L.A.S.Johnson & B.G.Briggs
Roupala — Neorites — Orites
Subtribe Lambertiinae (Venk.Rao) L.A.S.Johnson & B.G.Briggs
Lambertia — Xylomelum
Subtribe Heliciinae L.A.S.Johnson & B.G.Briggs
Helicia — Hollandaea
Subtribe Floydiinae L.A.S.Johnson & B.G.Briggs
Darlingia — Floydia

Banksieae
Authority: Rchb.
fossil form genera
Banksieaeidites  — Banksieaeformis  — Banksieaephyllum
Subtribe Musgraveinae L.A.S.Johnson & B.G.Briggs
Musgravea — Austromuellera
Subtribe Banksiinae L.A.S.Johnson & B.G.Briggs
Banksia

Embothrieae
Authority: Rchb.
Subtribe Lomatiinae L.A.S.Johnson & B.G.Briggs
Lomatia
Subtribe Embothriinae Endl.
Embothrium — Oreocallis — Alloxylon — Telopea
Subtribe Stenocarpinae L.A.S.Johnson & B.G.Briggs
Stenocarpus — Strangea
Subtribe Hakeinae Endl.
Opisthiolepis — Buckinghamia — Hakea — Grevillea — Finschia

Macadamieae
Authority: Venk.Rao
Subtribe Macadamiinae L.A.S.Johnson & B.G.Briggs
Macadamia — Panopsis — Brabejum
Subtribe Malagasiinae P.H.Weston & N.P.Barker
Malagasia — Catalepidia
Subtribe Virotiinae P.H.Weston & N.P.Barker
Virotia — Athertonia — Heliciopsis
Subtribe Gevuininae L.A.S.Johnson & B.G.Briggs
Cardwellia — Sleumerodendron — Euplassa — Gevuina — Bleasdalea — Hicksbeachia — Kermadecia — Turrillia

Uses

The nursery industry cultivates many Grevilleoideae species   as barrier plants and for their prominent and distinctive flowers and foliage.  Some species are of importance to the cut-flower industry, especially some Banksia and Dryandra species. Two species of the genus Macadamia and the Chilean species Gevuina avellana (Chilean hazel) are grown commercially for edible nuts. Chilean hazel has an acceptable frost tolerance.

References

External links

Proteaceae
Eudicot subfamilies